Venusia lilacina is a moth in the family Geometridae first described by William Warren in 1893. It is found in China, Nepal and India.

Subspecies
Venusia lilacina lilacina (Sikkim, Nepal)
Venusia lilacina melanogramma Wehrli, 1931 (China)
Venusia lilacina rala (Prout, 1938) (Kashmir)

References

Moths described in 1893
Venusia (moth)